Ali Erbaş (born in 1961 in Kabadüz, Ordu Province, Turkey) is a Turkish Muslim scholar and president of Directorate of Religious Affairs (Diyanet) in Turkey.

Education 
Erbaş attended elementary school in Yeşilyurt, and graduated from the Imam Hatip School in Sakarya in 1984.

Erbaş received a master's degree at the Marmara University in 1987, and achieved a PhD in the Department of History of Religions in 1993 at the same university.

Professional career 
In 1993 he was nominated lecturer at the Theological Faculty of the Sakarya University.

Then he carried out studies in his field as a guest member of the teaching staff of the Faculty of Human Sciences at the University of Strasbourg for a full year as of the beginning of the academic year 1996–1997.

He returned to Turkey at the beginning of 1997–1998 academic year and became an associate professor in November 1998 and professor in January 2004.

In 2016 he was nominated as the rector of the Yalova University.

Ali Erbaş was appointed President of the Directorate of Religious Affairs in September 2017.

Controversy 
Ali Erbaş, in his capacity as the head of the directorate of religious affairs, has stated during a sermon in the Hagia Sophia on the 24 April 2020 that homosexuality leads to illnesses, which drew criticism from the Bar Associations of Ankara and Diyarbakır. Both Bar associations resulted being investigated for insulting religious values over their critical remarks on Ali Erbaş. During the dispute, Erbas was supported by the Recep Tayyip Erdogan who mentioned that an assault on the Diyanets head would not be tolerated. Erbaş also claimed that HIV and all the evil and pandemics in the world are caused by homosexuality.

Personal life 
Ali Erbaş is married and has four children.

References

1961 births
People from Ordu
Living people
Turkish Muslims
Turkish Sunni Muslims
20th-century Muslims
21st-century Muslims
21st-century Muslim scholars of Islam
Imam Hatip school alumni
Marmara University alumni
Academic staff of Sakarya University
Religious affairs ministers of Turkey